Kyoto International School (KIS), formerly known as Kyoto Christian Day School, is an international school in Kyoto, Japan, which was founded in 1957. It serves students from 3 to 16 years old. The school has been accredited by the Western Association of Schools and Colleges (WASC) since 1992 and authorised by the International Baccalaureate Organisation (IBO) since 2006.

KIS has an enrollment of approximately 130 students from around 20 different countries.

The school is divided into four parts: Early Years, Primary, Middle School and High School.

KIS also offers an English immersion program on Saturdays for students aged 3 to 12 years old.

References

External links
School website

Elementary schools in Japan
Private schools in Japan
Educational institutions established in 1957
International schools in Kyoto
1957 establishments in Japan